Vladimir Antonov may refer to:

 Vladimir Aleksandrovich Antonov (born 1975), banker
 Vladimir Antonov-Ovseyenko (1883–1938), Soviet Bolshevik leader and diplomat
 Vladimir Antonov (architect), Russian architect